The 2020–21 Thai League 3 is the fourth season of the Thai League 3, the third-tier professional league for association football clubs in Thailand, since its establishment in 2017, also known as Omsin League Regional Championship due to the sponsorship deal with Government Savings Bank (Omsin Bank). Due to the COVID-19 pandemic in Thailand, the season must be postponed to start in late 2020 and end in early 2021. In addition, the Thai League 4 had combined with the Thai League 3 and compete as Thai League 3 since this season and there is no relegation in this season. A total of 72 teams would be divided into 6 regions including 11 teams in the Northern region, 11 teams in the Northeastern region, 12 teams in the Eastern region, 12 teams in the Western region, 12 teams in the Southern region, and 14 teams in the Bangkok metropolitan region.

Regional stage
The number of teams in 6 regions including 11 teams in the Northern region, 11 teams in the Northeastern region, 12 teams in the Eastern region, 12 teams in the Western region, 12 teams in the Southern region, and 14 teams in the Bangkok metropolitan region.

The winners and runners-up of each region will advance to the national championship stage to finding 3 teams promoted to the 2021–22 Thai League 2.

In late December 2020, the COVID-19 had spread again in Thailand, the FA Thailand must abruptly end the regional stage of the Thai League 3.

Northern region

League table

Northeastern region

League table

Eastern region

League table

Western region

League table

Southern region

League table

Bangkok Metropolitan region

League table

National championship stage

The national championship stage is the next stage from the regional stage. 1st and 2nd places of each zone qualified for this stage by featured in 2 groups. Teams from Northern, Northeastern, and Eastern regions would have qualified to the upper group. Meanwhile, teams from Western, Southern, and Bangkok Metropolitan regions would have qualified to the lower group. Winners, runners-ups, and third-placed of the national championship stage would be promoted to the 2021–22 Thai League 2.

Play-off round

|-
!colspan=3|Northern region

|-
!colspan=3|Bangkok metropolitan region

|}

Group stage
Upper region

Lower region

Knockout stage
Third place play-off

|}
Final

|}

Teams promoted to 2021–22 Thai League 2
 Lamphun Warriors (champions)
 Muangkan United (runners-up)
 Rajpracha (Third-placed)

See also
 2020–21 Thai League 1
 2020–21 Thai League 2
 2020–21 Thai League 3 Northern Region
 2020–21 Thai League 3 Northeastern Region
 2020–21 Thai League 3 Eastern Region
 2020–21 Thai League 3 Western Region
 2020–21 Thai League 3 Southern Region
 2020–21 Thai League 3 Bangkok Metropolitan Region
 2020–21 Thai League 3 National Championship
 2020–21 Thai FA Cup
 2020 Thailand Champions Cup

References

External links
Official website of Thai League

Thai League 3
2020 in Thai football leagues
Thai